Clascal is an object-oriented programming language (and associated  discontinued compiler) developed in 1983 by the Personal Office Systems (POS) division (later renamed The Lisa Division, then later The 32-Bit Systems Division) of  Apple Computer. Clascal was used to program applications for the Lisa Office System, the operating environment of the Lisa. According to Larry Tesler, this was developed as a replacement for their version of Smalltalk that was too slow.

It was an extension of Lisa Pascal, which in turn harked back to the UCSD Pascal model originally implemented on the Apple II. It was strongly influenced by the Xerox Palo Alto Research Center (PARC) release of Smalltalk-80, v1 (which had been formerly ported to the Lisa), and by Modula.

Clascal was the base for Object Pascal on the Apple Macintosh in 1985. With the demise of the Lisa in 1986, Pascal and Object Pascal continued to be used in the Macintosh Programmer's Workshop for systems and application development for several more years, until it was finally supplanted by the languages C and C++. The MacApp application framework was based on Toolkit originally written in Clascal.

Ultimately Object Pascal evolved into the language of Borland Delphi.

References

 

Programming languages
Pascal programming language family
Class-based programming languages
Object-oriented programming languages
High-level programming languages
Programming languages created in 1983